Elizabeth Arden, Inc. is a major American cosmetics, skin care and fragrance company founded by Elizabeth Arden. As of September 7, 2016, the company is a wholly owned subsidiary of Revlon, Inc.

History

The company was founded as Red Door salon on Fifth Avenue in 1910. Arden's company was then sold to Eli Lilly and Company in 1971 for $38 million ($ today). Eli Lilly and Company sold Arden to Fabergé in 1987 for $657 million. Arden's cosmetics company continues to trade today, and was bought from Unilever in 2003 by FFI for $225 million, a New York company. They changed the company's name to Elizabeth Arden, which was publicly listed. The company is located in Pembroke Pines, Florida, a suburb of Miami. The company continues to offer color coordinated make-up sets, as well as an extensive line of skin care products and treatments.

Past 'faces' of Elizabeth Arden were Vendela Kirsebom during the 1980s, Amber Valletta to the mid-1990s, and Catherine Zeta-Jones. Peter W. England served as president and chief executive officer for five years, before resigning in January 2000. He was commonly credited with restoring the company's image and profits. E. Scott Beattie became the company's chief executive officer (CEO) in March 2000, until Debra Perelman took over on May 23, 2018. On December 2, 2014, the company announced Karlina Caune would be the new face of the brand.

Since Arden's death, some of the company's focus has shifted to the development of a number of fragrance lines. The company's signature fragrance is called "Red Door" named after their day spas which are called "Elizabeth Arden Red Door Salons". Other fragrance within their own line are "Fifth Avenue", "Green Tea", "Provocative Woman", "Mediterranean", "Pretty", "Red Door Aura" and their newest, "Untold". The company also holds the license to Britney Spears fragrances, as well as the Hilary Duff, Elizabeth Taylor and Mariah Carey fragrance collections. Juicy Couture's "Viva la Juicy", "Couture Couture", and "Peace, Love & Juicy Couture", and Justin Bieber and Taylor Swift's fragrance collections are recent additions to the Arden portfolio.

In July 2012, as the first ever "Pin to give it" campaign on Pinterest, Elizabeth Arden aims to supply women with cancer with confidence-boosting make-up products. This is a part of the "Look Good Feel Better" campaign which the company has been a part of for several years. The LGFB is dedicated to helping cancer patients to manage the appearance-related side effects of cancer treatment.

Sale to Revlon
In June 2016, US cosmetics company Revlon announced its intention to buy Elizabeth Arden Inc. for US $870 million (£611m). When the deal was concluded, the company was expected to have annual gross sales of US $3 billion.

On September 7, 2016, Revlon completed its acquisition of Elizabeth Arden. At the time of the merger, it was expected that E. Scott Beattie would join Revlon, Inc.’s board of directors as non-executive vice chairman and serve as a senior advisor to Fabian Garcia, Revlon’s president and chief executive officer.

On November 3, 2016, Revlon’s board of directors appointed E. Scott Beattie, Elizabeth Arden’s former chairman, president and chief executive officer, to serve as a member of Revlon’s board of directors in the capacity of non-executive vice-chairman.

On June 16, 2022, its parent, Revlon, filed for Chapter 11 bankruptcy.

References

External links
About Elizabeth Arden at Elizabeth Arden Inc. website

Companies based in Broward County, Florida
Cosmetics brands
Companies formerly listed on the Nasdaq
Eli Lilly and Company
History of cosmetics
Miramar, Florida
Perfume houses
1971 mergers and acquisitions
1987 mergers and acquisitions
2016 mergers and acquisitions
Revlon
Former Unilever companies
Companies that filed for Chapter 11 bankruptcy in 2022